Bayanpur or Bayyanpur is a census town in Sonipat district, Haryana, India. It is in Sonipat.

References 

Cities and towns in Sonipat district